Eliot Blackwelder  (June 4, 1880 – January 14, 1969) was an American geologist who from 1922 to 1945 was head of the Stanford University department of geology. He served as president of the Geological Society of America in 1940 and of the Seismological Society of America from 1947 to 1949.

References

External links

1880 births
1969 deaths
20th-century American geologists
Stanford University faculty